Feale Rangers is a North Kerry Divisional Gaelic football team in Kerry. The teams involved are Clounmacon, Duagh, Finuge, Gale Rangers, Listowel Emmets, Moyvane and St Senan's.

History
The first mention of Feale Rangers was in 1956 when a Feale Rangers side represented North Kerry in the Kerry Senior Football Championship after two previous sides, North Kerry and Shannon Rangers joined forces.
This newly formed team contested the County Finals in 1959 and 1962 to John Mitchels and the semi-final in 1963, which they lost to eventual winners John Mitchels.
This was no bad result versus the great John Mitchels team that won the County Finals 5 times in a row in 1959, 1960, 1961, 1962 and 1963.
After this North Kerry again split into two teams: St. Vincent's and Shannon Rangers. Shannon Rangers did well and became county champions in 1964, 1972 and defeating finalists in 1971 and 1974 (to Mid Kerry and Kenmare respectively). St. Vincent's didn't do quite as well and in 1971 were renamed Feale Rangers.
Between 1977 and 1985 Feale Rangers contested six senior county finals, winning in 1978 and 1980 and winning Minor Finals in 1983, 1979 and 1978.
After that followed a barren period in which they lost the finals of 1982, 1983, 1985 and 1999.
In 2007 they won their last senior final. Eleven of the players that lost the 1999 final also played in the 2007 final.

Member Clubs
Clounmacon
Duagh
Finuge
Gale Rangers (defunct)
Listowel Emmets
Moyvane
St Senan's

Football

Grades

Honours
 Kerry Senior Football Championship Winners (3) 1978, 1980, 2007  Runners-Up 1959, 1962, 1977, 1982, 1983, 1985, 1999
 Kerry Minor Football Championship Winners (3) 1978, 1979, 1983  Runners-Up 1971, 1995
 Kerry Under-21 Football Championship Winners (2) 1997, 1998 Runners-Up 2019

Notable players
 Anthony Maher
 Tim Kennelly
 Éamonn Fitzmaurice
 Jimmy Deenihan
 Johnny Bunyan
 Stephen Stack
 Eamonn Breen
 Tadhg Kennelly
 Paul Galvin
 Noel Kennelly

Divisional boards of Kerry GAA
Gaelic games clubs in County Kerry